Robert James Potter  (6 October 1909 – 30 November 2010) was an English architect who was noted for his work on church buildings. Born in Guildford, he studied architecture in London before moving to Salisbury where he established his practice.

Buildings he designed include  St Francis Church in Salisbury, Church of the Ascension in Plymouth and South Stoneham Tower in Southampton. He was also involved in substantial renovations to existing buildings including Chichester Cathedral, Oxford's Bodleian Library, St Peter Mancroft (the largest church building in Norwich other than the city's cathedrals) and St Stephen Walbrook, All Souls Church, Langham Place and St Paul's Cathedral, all in central London. His expertise in creating community spaces beneath the foundations of historical church buildings earned him the nickname "The Mole".

Potter was awarded the OBE in 1993.

Early life and education
Potter was born in Guildford, Surrey to Jack Potter, an engraver who worked on printing blocks for Bank of England bank notes, and his wife Florence. After school he studied Architecture at the Regent Street Polytechnic.

Career
Potter moved to Salisbury in 1935 aged 26, establishing an architectural practice there. Within three years he was commissioned to design St Francis Church in the city, which has subsequently become a listed building. In the Second World War he served the Royal Engineers in northern India where he was involved in constructing road and rail networks to enable troop movements to the war in the Far East. He attained the rank of lieutenant-colonel during his wartime service.

After the war he returned to Salisbury and began a professional partnership with William Randoll Blacking, who had studied under Sir Ninian Comper and was known for his design and conservation work on ecclesiastical buildings. Their partnership lasted 11 years, after which Potter established his own firm with a new partner, Richard Hare, based in De Vaux House in Salisbury.

Potter's designs included military and residential buildings (such as the extensive extension to South Stoneham House in Southampton) but his primary focus was on church architecture; in 1958 his Church of the Ascension, Crownhill in Plymouth was consecrated and in 1959 he started work on St George's, in Oakdale, Poole. Potter's practice expanded in 1967, being renamed the Brandt, Potter, Hare Partnership and opening an office in Southampton.

Potter's work was not purely focussed on new builds, he was involved in substantial renovation works to a number of well known buildings including Chichester Cathedral, Oxford's Bodleian Library, St Peter Mancroft (the largest church building in Norwich other than the city's cathedrals) and St Stephen Walbrook, All Souls Church, Langham Place and St Paul's Cathedral, all in central London. He became well known for creating community rooms under the foundations of ancient church buildings and earned the nickname "The Mole" as a result. In addition to his work on the buildings themselves, Potter was noted for his designs of fixtures and fittings including organs, crosses, candlesticks and fonts.

From 1978 to 1984, he was Surveyor of the Fabric of St Paul's Cathedral.

In 1989 Potter's designs were used to extend the St Edward the Confessor Roman Catholic Church in Chandler's Ford, Hampshire, the original building of which had been designed by Potter's first professional partner, William Randoll Blacking.

Potter was awarded the OBE in 1993.

Personal life
Potter married his first wife, Geraldine Buchanan, when he moved to Salisbury in 1935. They had three children together but divorced in the early 1960s. He married again to Margaret and had two step children. He enjoyed watercolour painting and sailing, having obtained a master mariner's certificate.

Notable works
The notable buildings that Potter designed or worked on include:

References

1909 births
2010 deaths
People from Guildford
People from Salisbury
Architects from Surrey
Architects from Wiltshire
20th-century English architects
Officers of the Order of the British Empire
English centenarians
Men centenarians
English ecclesiastical architects